The 1977 football season was São Paulo's 48th season since club's existence.

Statistics

Scorers

Overall 
{|class="wikitable"
|-
|Games played || 74 (21 Campeonato Paulista, 46 Campeonato Brasileiro, 9 Friendly match)
|-
|Games won || 40 (13 Campeonato Paulista, 23 Campeonato Brasileiro, 4 Friendly match)
|-
|Games drawn || 20 (4 Campeonato Paulista, 13 Campeonato Brasileiro, 3 Friendly match)
|-
|Games lost || 16 (4 Campeonato Paulista, 10 Campeonato Brasileiro, 2 Friendly match)
|-
|Goals scored || 121
|-
|Goals conceded || 58
|-
|Goal difference || +59
|-
|Best result || 6–1 (H) v Marília - Campeonato Paulista - 1977.07.13
|-
|Worst result || 0–3 (A) v Portuguesa - Campeonato Paulista - 1977.03.27
|-
|Most appearances || 
|-
|Top scorer || Serginho (50)
|-

Friendlies

Torneio Triangular Luiz Lamejo

Official competitions

Campeonato Pauista

Record

Campeonato Brasileiro

Record

External links
official website 

Association football clubs 1977 season
1977
1977 in Brazilian football